The 1856 Florida gubernatorial election was held on October 6, 1856. Democratic Nominee Madison S. Perry defeated Know Nothing candidate David S. Walker.

The Election was decided by 320 votes.

General election

Candidates

Democratic 

 Madison S. Perry

Whig 

 David S. Walker

Results

Results by County

See also 

 1856 United States presidential election in Florida
 1856 United States House of Representatives election in Florida

References 

1856 Florida elections
Florida
Florida gubernatorial elections